Roomsharing is where two or more people occupy a room, typically a bedroom. Roomsharing is the norm in some cultures, such as by Mayan families in rural Guatemala. In cultures where it is not normal, it may be comported out of viability, perhaps due to impoverishment. In some developed parts of the world, it may be illegal for siblings of the opposite sex to share a room if they are above a certain age, while it would be fine to do so with a sibling of the same sex or gender identity.

See also
Family

References

Rooms